Lackawaxen may refer to:

Places
In Pennsylvania:
Lackawaxen River, a tributary of the Delaware River
Lackawaxen Township, Pennsylvania, in Pike County

Ships
, World War II oiler launched as Lackawapen, later changed to Lackawaxen

See also